Amager Boldklub af 1970 is a Danish defunct association football club, now a part of AB Tårnby. They played at Vestamager Idrætscenter on Amager, Copenhagen, which has a capacity of 1,000. Founded in 1970, the club played three seasons in the third-tier Danish 2nd Division East from 2005 to 2008, but was relegated to the Denmark Series before the club merged with Tårnby Boldklub starting from 1 January 2009.

External links
 Official homepage
AB 70 Danish division history at Haslund.info

Defunct football clubs in Denmark
Association football clubs established in 1970
1970 establishments in Denmark
2008 disestablishments in Denmark
Football clubs in Copenhagen